Necirwan Khalil Mohammad (born 5 May 1992) is a German-Syrian footballer who plays as a midfielder for VfB Homberg.

Career
Born in Syria, Khalil Mohammad went to Germany with his family at age four. He started his career with FC Norden, then he played for Kickers Emden, Grün-Weiß Wuppertal, Borussia Mönchengladbach II, SG Wattenscheid, Alemannia Aachen and SC Wiedenbrück.

He made his professional debut for KFC Uerdingen in the 3. Liga on 17 December 2018, coming on as a substitute in the 84th minute for Maximilian Beister in the 2–0 away win against Wehen Wiesbaden.

In August 2020, he joined VfB Homberg.

References

External links
 Profile at DFB.de
 Profile at kicker.de
 
 KFC Uerdingen profile

1992 births
Living people
German footballers
Syrian footballers
Syrian Kurdish people
German people of Syrian descent
Association football midfielders
Borussia Mönchengladbach II players
SG Wattenscheid 09 players
Alemannia Aachen players
SC Wiedenbrück 2000 players
KFC Uerdingen 05 players
VfB Homberg players
3. Liga players
Regionalliga players